Honde refers to:

 Honde, a cultivar of Karuka
 Honde River, a river in Zimbabwe and Mozambique
 Honde Valley, the African valley containing the Honde River
 Steph Honde (born 1975), French musician